"The Kindness of Strangers" is the fourth episode of the second season of the NBC superhero drama series Heroes. It originally aired on October 15, 2007. This episode marks the first appearance of Monica Dawson, played by Dana Davis, who joins the main cast.

Plot
Nathan Petrelli visits his sons at school, telling them their grandmother (Angela Petrelli) was in the hospital. When he visits his mother with Matt Parkman, she confesses to being the one that pushed Kaito Nakamura off the building. Matt, however, reads her thoughts and advises Nathan that her confession is false. He shows Nathan the defaced photographs of Angela and Kaito and Nathan provides Matt with a copy of the complete photograph. The photo shows Daniel Linderman, both of Nathan's parents (Angela and Arthur), Mohinder Suresh's boss Bob, Charles Deveaux, Kaito Nakamura, two unidentified men, three unidentified women and a man Matt identifies as his father, Maury. Later, Nathan has a nightmarish vision of himself with horrible burns over his body.

Maya and Alejandro are traveling by car with the american prisoner, Derek. He mentions that he is really from New Jersey, but he got the car in California. The conversation is cut short as the trio spots a body in the middle of the road. It is a disoriented Sylar, who joins them. Maya explains to Sylar (who identifies himself by his real name of Gabriel Gray) that she and her brother are journeying to New York to find Chandra Suresh, but Alejandro is wary of his presence. However, at a stop in Mexico, Derek sees a newspaper identifying the twins as murderers and tries to plan with Sylar to turn them in to the police. Sylar shows the twins the headline and asks if the picture is of them. Alejandro tells Maya to deny it, but she admits that they are the suspects. On the verge of tears, Maya nearly kills Sylar but her brother stops her powers from activating. Realizing that the twins both have abilities, Sylar agrees to help them get to New York. As they speed off, Derek is seen dead by a pay phone in a pool of his own blood, killed by Sylar.

Micah Sanders awakens to a splash of water from his cousin Damon. Damon asks his grandmother and sister Monica for $65 to watch WWE WrestleMania 22 on Pay-Per-View, though both refuse. Later, Micah uses his technopathy to "hot-wire" the television to put on the wrestling match, which earns his cousin's respect.

Monica Dawson is trying to enter a management training program for the burger restaurant where she works. Subconsciously during work, she recreates a perfect tomato rose, more complex than the one she saw on the cooking show her grandmother was watching. As she thinks of a way to get her life back on track, the manager calls her back, informing her that she did not get the promotion. On closing duty the next day, she stops a robbery at her restaurant with a 619 that she saw on the pay-per-view by Rey Mysterio that Damon was watching.

Claire Bennet goes on another date with West against her father's wishes, where they share another kiss over the Hollywood sign. After convincing Claire to open up to him and jump from the sign, West catches her as she falls to prove that he'll be there to catch her should she ever need him physically or emotionally. In order to cover up her relationship, she tells her father that she has joined the school's cheerleading team.

Noah Bennet is concerned about Claire seeing a love interest, since he worries that such relations would endanger the family and his own life, as seen in the eighth of Isaac's paintings. He later meets with The Haitian, who proposes they go on a trip to Odessa, Ukraine  to find the rest of Isaac Mendez's paintings. Noah tries to think of an excuse for his absence.

Matt Parkman asks Molly to locate his father from the photograph. In a fit of screaming, Molly throws the picture down and says that Matt's father is the "nightmare man" that kept finding her. Mohinder and Matt argue about getting Molly involved, until Molly says she'll do it for Matt. After pinpointing his location, she is caught in a struggle and  she calls out "Matt" in a plea for help. She then lapses into a state of shock. Matt tries desperately to revive her, only to hear Molly in his mind, screaming for help.

Critical reception
In the 18-49 demographic, "The Kindness of Strangers" earned a 5.2/12 ratings share. This episode was watched by 11.41 million viewers.

Sean O'Neal of The A.V. Club gave the episode a B+.

Robert Canning of IGN scored the episode 7 out of 10

Production details

A geographical error occurs in dialogue, possibly due to a production oversight: Monica Dawson, a native of New Orleans, mistakenly refers to St. Bernard Parish as a county.

References

External links

Heroes (season 2) episodes
2007 American television episodes